The women's K-2 500 metres event was a pairs kayaking event conducted as part of the Canoeing at the 1972 Summer Olympics program.

Medalists

Results

Heats
The 12 crews first raced in two heats on September 5. The top three finishers from each of the heats advanced directly to the final; the remaining six teams were relegated to the semifinal.

Semifinal
The top three finishers in the semifinal (raced on September 8) advanced to the final.

Final
The final was held on September 9.

References
1972 Summer Olympics official report Volume 3. p. 496. 
Sports-reference.com 1972 women's K-2 500 m results.

Women's K-2 500
Olympic
Women's events at the 1972 Summer Olympics